Carrick was a single-member county constituency of the Parliament of Northern Ireland.

Boundaries and Boundary Changes
This was a division of County Antrim. Before 1929 it was part of the seven-member Antrim constituency. The constituency sent one MP to the House of Commons of Northern Ireland from 1929 until the Parliament was temporarily suspended in 1972, and then formally abolished in 1973.

In terms of the then local government areas the constituency in 1929 comprised parts of the rural districts of Antrim, Belfast and Larne. The division also included the whole of the urban districts of Ballyclare and Carrickfergus.

After boundary changes in 1969, the constituency included parts of the rural districts of Antrim and Larne, the borough of Carrickfergus, the urban district of Ballyclare and part of the urban district of Carrickfergus.

Members of Parliament

Elections

The parliamentary representatives of the division were elected using the first past the post system.

 Resignation of Gordon

 Death of Campbell

 Resignation of Curran on appointment as a Justice of the High Court

 Boundary changes

 Parliament prorogued 30 March 1972 and abolished 18 July 1973

References
 Northern Ireland Parliamentary Election Results 1921–1972, compiled and edited by Sydney Elliott (Political Reference Publications 1973)

External source
 For the exact definition of Northern Ireland constituency boundaries see http://www.election.demon.co.uk/stormont/boundaries.html 

Northern Ireland Parliament constituencies established in 1929
Historic constituencies in County Antrim
Carrickfergus
Northern Ireland Parliament constituencies disestablished in 1973